The following is a list of players who have won the Tougeki fighting game tournament.

2003

2004

2005

2006

2007

2008

2009

2010

2011

2012

References

Tougeki – Super Battle Opera
Tougeki